The 1984–85 Copa del Rey was the 83rd staging of the Spanish Cup, the annual domestic football cup competition in Spain. The tournament was attended by 142 teams from the higher echelons of Spanish football.

The tournament began on 12 September 1984 and ended on 30 June 1985 with the final, held at the Santiago Bernabéu Stadium in Madrid.

The final was played between Athletic Bilbao (the defending champions of the tournament), and Atlético Madrid. The match ended with a 2–1 victory for the team from the capital, with Hugo Sánchez as the star, scoring two goals.

With this victory Atlético secured their sixth cup, making them the team with the fourth-most titles in the competition.

Format 

 All rounds are played over two legs except the final which is played a single match in a neutral venue. The team that has the higher aggregate score over the two legs progresses to the next round.
 In case of a tie on aggregate, will play an extra time of 30 minutes, and if still tied, will be decided with a penalty shoot-outs.
 The teams that play European competitions are exempt until the round of 16 or when they are removed from the tournament.
 The winners of the competition will earn a place in the group stage of next season's UEFA Cup Winners' Cup, if they have not already qualified for European competition, if so then the runners-up will instead take this berth.

First round

Second round

Third round

Fourth round

Bracket

Round of 16 

|}

First leg

Second leg

Quarter-finals 

|}

First leg

Second leg

Semi-finals 

|}

First leg

Second leg

Final

References

External links 

  RSSSF
  Linguasport

Copa del Rey seasons
1984–85 in Spanish football cups